Appearing Nightly is a live album by American composer, bandleader and keyboardist Carla Bley, recorded in Paris in 2006 and released on the Watt/ECM label in 2008. Bley's compositions and arrangements incorporate many references to big bands and jazz standards from the swing era. The album contains two compositions commissioned by the Jazz Orchestra of Sardinia, and a suite inspired by nightclubs and big bands of the 1950s commissioned for the Monterey Jazz Festival.

Reception
The Allmusic review by Thom Jurek awarded the album 4 stars and stated "Ultimately, this is a very enjoyable set, one that begs repeated playing and deeper listening to get all the referent points, at the very least. But the truth is that it is so enjoyable, you'll find yourself getting lost in the music so often you'll forget to check".

The All About Jazz review by C. Michael Bailey said that "Comparisons of Bley's big band talents to Ellington and Charles Mingus are not hyperbole. In a field crowded with every measure of big bands, Carla Bley's Big Band stands as one of the most inventive and unique ensembles" Another review by Budd Kopman stated "Bley has surely succeeded in musically incarnating her past and her love of that music with her ever-present wit and high spirits".

The JazzTimes review by Mike Shanley said "Carla Bley’s humor shapes a good portion of her music, but it never becomes the main focus of a composition...  A sly wink, musically speaking, can say so much... the mood ranges from lyrically sentimental to hard swinging on a harmonic area not normally associated with big bands". In June 2009 the well-respected Jazz Journalists Association honored the album with their award Record of the Year.

Track listing
All compositions by Carla Bley.
 "Greasy Gravy" - 8:50
 "Awful Coffee" - 6:11
 "Appearing Nightly at the Black Orchid: 40 On-20 Off/Second Round/What Would You Like to Hear/Last Call" - 25:23
 "Someone to Watch" - 5:56
 "I Hadn't Anyone 'Till You" (Ray Noble) - 7:38
Recorded live at New Morning in Paris on July 17 & 18, 2006.

Personnel
Carla Bley - piano
Earl Gardner, Lew Soloff, Florian Esch - trumpet
Beppe Calamosca, Gary Valente, Gigi Grata - trombone
Richard Henry - bass trombone
Roger Jannotta - soprano saxophone, alto saxophone, flute
Wolfgang Puschnig - alto saxophone, flute
Andy Sheppard,  - tenor saxophone
Julian Argüelles - baritone saxophone
Karen Mantler - organ
Steve Swallow - bass guitar
Billy Drummond - drums

References

ECM Records live albums
Carla Bley live albums
2008 live albums